Calamba Poblacion, is a barangay district located at the east edge, in the city of Calamba, Laguna, Philippines. This district comprises seven barangays, Barangay I, II, III, IV, V, VI, VII. The Calamba Poblacion is bounded of Calamba River between Parian.

Population

Gallery

See also 
 Rizal Shrine (Calamba)
 Calamba Claypot

References

Calamba, Laguna
Poblacion